Cennad: cylchgrawn Y Gymdeithas Feddygol was a Welsh-language trade magazine containing articles on clinical and general medicine in Wales. it was published by Y Gymdeithas Feddygol, which was formed in 1975 to provide an opportunity for doctors and medical students to discuss clinical topics in Welsh. Cennad was published from 1980 to 2003 and has been digitised by the Welsh Journals Online project at the National Library of Wales.

References

External links
Cennad at Welsh Journals Online
Y Gymdeithas Feddygol website

Welsh-language magazines
Professional and trade magazines
Magazines established in 1980
Magazines disestablished in 2003
Medical magazines
Defunct magazines published in the United Kingdom